Auto Safari Chapín is an animal park near Escuintla, Guatemala. The park features several areas including: 
 Drive-through animal preserve with areas for lions, giraffes, hippopotamus and other species
 Walk-through zoo (near the entrance to the recreation area)
 Recreation area with a restaurant, lagoon boat rides and a swimming pool

It is open Tuesday through Sunday, from 9:30 am to 5 pm. The restaurant is open from 10:30 am to 5 pm. There is a snack bar midway through the drive-through with drinks and a small selection of snacks.
 
The park was founded in 1980 as a natural reserve area and is the largest animal parks/zoos in Guatemala. It lies on the 87.5 km at the CA-2 highway, between Escuintla and Taxisco.

Notes

External links
  

Safari parks
Parks in Guatemala
Tourist attractions in Guatemala
Escuintla Department
Zoos established in 1980
1980 establishments in Guatemala